Clemens Timpler (1563 – 28 February 1624) was a German philosopher, physicist and theologian.

Along with Jakob Degen (1511–1587), he is considered an important Protestant metaphysician, establishing the Protestant Reformed Neuscholastik.

Life
Timpler was born in Stolpen.  In 1600 he joined Bartholomew Keckermann studying philosophy at Leipzig. In April 1595, he became professor of physics at Gymnasium Arnoldinum, a high school in Steinfurt. He taught there until his death.

Publications
 Metaphysicae systema methodicum Steinfurt 1604
 Physicae Seu Philosophiae Naturalis Systema Methodicum, Hannover 1605
 Clementis Timpleri Technologia seu tractatus generalis de natura et differentiis artium liberalium; die gloria Dei als schlechthin letztes Ziel aller techne in Theorem 9.
 Exercitationum Philosophicarum Sectiones X : In Quibus Quaestiones Selectae Et Utiles, Praesertim Metaphysicae, ultra quadringentas, accurate & dilucide discutiuntur & enodantur Hannover: Antonius 1618
 Theoria Physica, De Sensu In Genere : Certis Thesibus comprehensa. Steinfurt: Caesar 1616

Further reading
 Karl Eschweiler: Die Philosophie der spanischen Spätscholastik auf den deutschen Universitäten des siebzehnten Jahrhunderts., Münster: Aschendorff 1928 (Spanische Forschungen der Görres-Gesellschaft I), S. 251-325 (Digitalisat)
 Joseph S.Freedman: European Academic Philosophy in the Late Sixteenth and Early Seventeenth Centuries the Life, Significance and Philosophy of Clemens Timpler (1563/4-1624), Hildesheim 1988 , 
 Joseph S.Freedman: Die Karriere und Bedeutung von Clemens Timpler (1563/64-1624) In: Porträts aus vier Jahrhunderten Arnoldinum, Steinfurt, Greven 1988, 69-77
 Joseph S.Freedman: Aristotelianism and Humanism in Late Reformation German Philosophy: The Case of Clemens Timpler, 1563/64-1624. In The Harvest of German Humanism. Papers in Honor of Lewis W. Spitz. Edited by Fleischer Manfred. St. Louis: Concordia Press 1992, 213-232 
 Joseph S.Freedman: The Soul ("anima") according to Clemens Timpler (1563/64-1624) and Some of his Central European Contemporaries, Wiesbaden 2004, 791-830
 Joseph S.Freedman: Necessity, Contingency, Impossibility, Possibility, and Modal Enunciations within the Writings of Clemens Timpler (1563/4-1624). In Spätrenaissance-Philosophie in Deutschland 1570-1650. Entwürfe zwischen Humanismus und Konfessionalisierung, okkulten Traditionen und Schulmetaphysik.  Edited by Mulsow Martin. Berlin: de Gruyter 2009, 293-318
 Albert Röser: Clemens Timpler und die Metaphysik. In: (ibid) Porträts aus vier Jahrhunderten Arnoldinum, Steinfurt Steinfurt 1988, 76-83
 Max Wundt: Der Deutsche Schulmetaphysik des 17 Jahrhunderts'', Tübingen, 1939, 75 ss.

External links
History of Ontology from Suarez to Kant
The Birth of Ontology. A selection of Ontologists from 1560 to 1770
Bibliography of Joseph S. Freedman on Philosophy in Central Europe (1500-1700) contains abstract of the publications on Timpler

1563 births
1624 deaths
People from Stolpen
17th-century German philosophers
17th-century German scientists
German male writers